Shrichand Kriplani (born 18 July 1958) was a member of the 14th Legislative Assembly of Rajasthan. He represented the Nimbahera constituency of Rajasthan (2013-2018) and is a member of the Bharatiya Janata Party political party. He served as the Housing and Urban Development Minister under the Vasundhara Raje cabinet. He lost to Udailal Anjana in 2018 assembly election by margin of 11,908 votes.

He has been inducted in Vasundhara Raje Cabinet as Minister of Urban Development and Housing in Cabinet Expansion which took place on Saturday, 10 December 2016 at Jaipur.

External links
 Official biographical sketch in Parliament of India website

1958 births
Living people
Bharatiya Janata Party politicians from Rajasthan
Rajasthani politicians
India MPs 2004–2009
People from Chittorgarh district
India MPs 1999–2004
Lok Sabha members from Rajasthan